Carex unilateralis, the lateral sedge, is a species of sedge that was first described by Kenneth Mackenzie in 1922. The specific epithet, is derived from Latin and means "one-sided".

References 

Unilateralis
Plants described in 1922